Gaby Cárdenas (5 January 1958 – 5 October 2022) was a Peruvian former volleyball player who competed in the 1976 Summer Olympics and in the 1980 Summer Olympics. She was a member of the Peruvian team that won second place in the World Championship in 1982.

Cárdenas died on 5 October 2022.

References

1958 births
2022 deaths
Peruvian women's volleyball players
Olympic volleyball players of Peru
Volleyball players at the 1976 Summer Olympics
Volleyball players at the 1980 Summer Olympics
20th-century Peruvian women
21st-century Peruvian women
Pan American Games medalists in volleyball
Pan American Games silver medalists for Peru
Medalists at the 1975 Pan American Games
Sportspeople from Lima